Rachid Housni (born 2 May 1990) is a Moroccan footballer who plays as a midfielder.

Club

Wydad Casablanca
 Botola:
 Winner: 2014-2015

Club career
Born in France, Moroccan national Housni played for a number of French clubs in his early career. His first club was Lormont, before joining Trélissac, where he spent 3 years, amassing 29 appearances and 4 goals. A spell at Stade Bordelais and a return to Lormont followed, before he secured a move to Moroccan side Chabab Rif Al Hoceima.

On 12 January 2015, Housni was signed by Wydad Casablanca on a four and a half year long deal.

International career
Housni made his international debut for Morocco on 22 October 2016; scoring in their 4-0 thrashing of Libya in the 2016 African Nations Championship qualification.

Career statistics

International

International goals
Scores and results list Morocco's goal tally first.

References

External links
 
 
 

1990 births
Living people
Association football midfielders
Moroccan footballers
Botola players
Chabab Rif Al Hoceima players
RS Berkane players
Morocco international footballers